Maryland Route 36 (also known as MD 36 or Route 36) is a  state highway located in Allegany County, Maryland, United States. MD 36's southern terminus is at the West Virginia Route 46 (WV 46) bridge in Westernport and its northern terminus at U.S. Route 40 Alternate (US 40 Alt.) near Cumberland. Between Westernport and Frostburg, it is known as Georges Creek Road, and from Frostburg to Cumberland it is known as Mount Savage Road. Like the majority of Maryland state highways, MD 36 is maintained by the Maryland State Highway Administration (MDSHA).

MD 36 serves as the main road through the Georges Creek Valley, a region which is historically known for coal mining, and has been designated by MDSHA as part of the Coal Heritage Scenic Byway. MD 36 is the main road connecting the towns of Westernport, Lonaconing, and Midland in southwestern Allegany County, as well as Frostburg, Mount Savage, and Corriganville in northwestern Allegany County.

Route description
MD 36 has two main sections: Georges Creek Road, which runs along the Georges Creek Valley, from Westernport to Frostburg in southwestern Allegany County, and Mount Savage Road, which runs eastward from Frostburg to Cumberland in northwestern Allegany County. MD 36 is a part of the National Highway System as a principal arterial from Interstate 68 (I-68) to US 40 Alt. in Frostburg and from MD 35 at Corriganville to US 40 Alt. in Cumberland.

Georges Creek Road
MD 36 begins at the WV 46 bridge in Westernport, crossing MD 135 in Westernport, and runs northeast across western Allegany County as a two-lane undivided road named Georges Creek Road, named for Georges Creek, a North Branch Potomac River tributary which the road parallels. The roadway also parallels the Georges Creek Railway. A short distance outside Westernport city limits, MD 36 intersects MD 937, an old alignment of MD 36. Near Barton, MD 36 intersects MD 935, which is the old alignment of MD 36 through Barton. MD 36 bypasses Barton, climbing the hillside above the Georges Creek Valley before descending back into the valley as it approaches Lonaconing. MD 935 returns to MD 36 south of Lonaconing, with its northern terminus at MD 36.

As the road enters Lonaconing, it narrows and passes through the town as Main Street, intersecting Douglas Avenue near the center of Lonaconing. Along Main Street in Lonaconing is the Lonaconing Iron Furnace, a historic blast furnace which operated in the early 19th century.

MD 36 then continues toward Midland. At Midland, there is a sharp curve in the road. Along this curve, MD 36 intersects Church Street, which connects to MD 936, the old alignment of MD 36 between Midland and Frostburg. The new alignment of MD 36 proceeds northeast, passing near Vale Summit, where it intersects MD 55.

North of the MD 55 intersection, MD 36 passes west of a park and ride lot before it meets I-68/US 40 at a diamond interchange at exit 34. Near this interchange is God's Ark of Safety, a church famous for its attempt to build a replica of Noah's Ark. Between Midland and Frostburg, there is a short section near the I-68/US 40 interchange where MD 36 expands to four lanes. Upon entering Frostburg, MD 36 joins US 40 Alt. as Main Street. MD 36 follows Main Street westward through Frostburg, meeting the northern terminus of MD 936 at Grant Street. At Depot Street, near the center of Frostburg, MD 36 connects to the western depot of the Western Maryland Scenic Railroad. At the intersection with Water Street, MD 36 leaves US 40 Alt., and upon leaving Frostburg city limits its name changes to Mount Savage Road.

Mount Savage Road
After leaving Frostburg, MD 36 is known as Mount Savage Road, as it travels eastward, perpendicular to its signed direction, toward Mount Savage. North of Eckhart Mines, MD 36 meets MD 638, which connects MD 36 to US 40 Alt. in Eckhart Mines. The road between Frostburg and Mount Savage is particularly curvy, and includes several hairpin turns near Frostburg.

As the road enters Mount Savage, it passes by the Mount Savage Castle, a Scottish-style castle built in 1840, which currently operates as a bed-and-breakfast. In Mount Savage, the route narrows as it follows Main Street. East of Mount Savage, the route widens.

In Barrelville, MD 36 intersects MD 47, which connects it with PA 160 in Somerset County. From its intersection with MD 47 to its terminus at Cumberland, MD 36 follows newer alignments, with the old alignments being designated MD 831. At Corriganville, MD 36 intersects MD 35, which connects it with PA 96 in Bedford County. MD 36 ends at US 40 Alt. at the Narrows near Cumberland.

History

MD 36 passes through the Georges Creek Valley, which has a long history of coal mining. In recognition of this, the MDSHA has designated MD 36 as part of the Coal Heritage Scenic Byway. Coal mining was a major industry in western Maryland in the 19th century, with railroads being the major route connecting the coal mines to markets outside the Georges Creek Valley. Deep mining, which was the primary mining method used in western Maryland, declined in use after World War II, replaced primarily by surface mining. Although Maryland coal production is now only a small fraction of total U.S. coal production, coal from the Georges Creek Valley is used to power the AES Warrior Run power plant in Cumberland.

MD 36 was assigned a route number before 1927, earlier than most of the other Maryland state highways. The original alignment of MD 36 in southern Allegany County closely paralleled the Georges Creek Railroad. Later realignments have shifted MD 36 away from the railroad in several locations, but three crossings remain: one north of Lonaconing, one south of Lonaconing near the MD 935 intersection, and a third crossing near Westernport.

Over the years, multiple new alignments of MD 36 have been built for various reasons, such as to smooth out curves in the road. Several of the old alignments have been assigned route numbers of their own. The southernmost of these is MD 937, which consists of the old alignment through Westernport. Prior to the construction of the bridge connecting MD 36 to WV 46, MD 937 was the alignment of MD 36 through Westernport, ending at MD 135. In Barton, MD 935 carries the old alignment of MD 36. The longest of the old alignment sections is MD 936, which runs from Midland to Frostburg, and was bypassed in the 1970s with a new alignment of MD 36 following part of MD 55 and connecting to Interstate 68 (I-68). Prior to this change, MD 55 ended in Midland; it has since been truncated to its current terminus at Vale Summit.

North of Frostburg, several old alignments are designated as MD 831, though these segments of road are not signed. Among these segments of road are Kriegbaum Road (designated as MD 831C), and Old Mount Savage Road (designated as MD 831A). Kriegbaum Road splits from MD 36 west of Corriganville and runs through Corriganville, returning to MD 36 east of the town. Old Mount Savage Road intersects MD 36 west of the Cumberland Narrows, and runs southward to intersect US 40 Alt. near its current intersection with MD 36.

Junction list

See also

References

External links

MDRoads: MD 36
Maryland Roads - MD 36

036
Maryland Route 036